This is a list of Portuguese television related events from 2013.

Events
1 January - Rúben Boa Nova wins series 3 of Secret Story.
27 January - Cátia Palhinha, the runner-up of the second series of Secret Story is voted winner of the first series of Secret Story: Desafio Final.
21 July - Model Pedro Guedes wins Big Brother VIP.
22 September - Morangos com Açúcar actress Sara Matos and her partner André Branco win the first series of Dança com as Estrelas.
6 October - Launch of the Portuguese version of The X Factor.

Debuts
28 July - Dança com as Estrelas (2013–present)
6 October - Factor X (2013–present)

Television shows

2000s
Ídolos (2003-2005, 2009–present)

2010s
Secret Story (2010–present)
A Voz de Portugal (2011–present)

Ending this year

Births

Deaths